Mount Holly is a township that is the county seat of Burlington County in the U.S. state of New Jersey. It is an eastern suburb of Philadelphia, the nation's sixth largest city as of 2020. As of the 2020 United States census, the township's population was 9,981, an increase of 445 (+4.7%) from the 2010 census count of 9,536, which in turn reflected a decline of 1,192 (-11.1%) from the 10,728 counted in the 2000 census.

What is now Mount Holly was originally formed as Northampton on November 6, 1688. Northampton was incorporated as one of New Jersey's initial group of 104 townships created by an act of the New Jersey Legislature on February 21, 1798. Portions of the township were taken to form Little Egg Harbor Township (February 13, 1740, now part of Ocean County), Washington Township (November 19, 1802), Pemberton borough (December 15, 1826), Coaxen Township (March 10, 1845, now known as Southampton Township), Pemberton Township (March 10, 1846), Westampton Township (March 6, 1850) and Lumberton Township (March 14, 1860). There had been a Mount Holly post office since before the 1870 U.S. Census. The township was renamed Mount Holly as of November 6, 1931, based on the results of a referendum held three days earlier. The township was named for hills covered with holly trees.  Some areas of today's Mount Holly were known as Bridgetown.

Mount Holly gives its name to the National Weather Service Weather Forecast Office for the Philadelphia metropolitan area, though the office is actually located in adjacent Westampton.

History

Colonial era
The first European settlement in what is now Mount Holly began in 1677 when Walter Reeves acquired land from the Lenape (Delaware) Native Americans living in the area. He constructed a dam on Rancocas Creek to channel water through a raceway to power a gristmill and sawmill. Edward Gaskill and his sons dug the mill race on their property between 1720 and 1723. After the mills were established, more settlers were attracted to the area and built houses and commercial buildings on High, Church, White, Mill, and Pine streets, including the Shinn Curtis Log House (1712). By 1800, over 250 dwellings had been built.

Today no mills remain on the raceway, which still flows in its original course from the Rancocas just above the dam. The raceway proved a way for herring to make their way above the dam and was the scene of an annual fish run in the spring, which provided fresh herring for salting and eating. The former mill land has been preserved as the Mill Dam Park. It marks the importance of mills to the early settlements.

Revolutionary War
On December 17, 1776, Colonel Samuel Griffin of the Continental Army crossed the Delaware River with 600 men, mostly untrained men and boys with little equipment, who marched to Mount Holly where they set up a few 3-pounder artillery pieces on Iron Works Hill. Hessian commanders von Block and Carl von Donop were told that there were 3,000 American troops at Mount Holly.

By December 23, 1776, 2,000 Hessians were moved from Bordentown and positioned at The Mount in Mount Holly, where they engaged in a three-day-long artillery exchange, known as the Battle of Iron Works Hill or Battle of Mount Holly, with the Americans on Iron Works Hill. The Americans slipped away that night.

After George Washington crossed the Delaware River on December 25, 1776, the fact that thousands of Hessian troops had been drawn to Mount Holly aided in the Continental Army's success in the Battle of Trenton the next day, a surprising American victory that helped turn the Army's fading morale after the disastrous defeat at the Battle of Fort Washington just weeks before and the ignominious retreat through New Jersey.

19th century
The 1793 state legislature approved the relocation of the Burlington County seat from Burlington City to Mount Holly, which was approved by voters in a 1796 referendum. Several important municipal buildings were constructed, including the courthouse in 1796 and the county prison built circa 1819.  The Burlington County Prison was designed by Robert Mills, a nationally known architect who designed the Washington Monument. The town has numerous 18th and 19th-century buildings, most of which are included in the Mount Holly Historic District. Commercial buildings were constructed primarily along High Street.

In 1849, the Burlington and Mount Holly Railroad was established, connecting communities along the Delaware River to Philadelphia, the major city of the area. The railroad supported industrialization along its route. The Camden and Mount Holly Railroad constructed a station 20 years later near the intersection of Washington and King streets.

20th century
A trolley station was built in 1904 for passengers making connections to Burlington City and Moorestown. New municipal buildings were constructed during the 20th century, including the Town Hall on Washington Street (1930) and the U.S. Post Office (1935) located across the street (1935), both federally funded and constructed as Works Progress Administration projects under President Franklin D. Roosevelt during the Great Depression.

In the late 1950s, Mount Holly began to have economic difficulties due to industrial restructuring and the loss of working-class jobs. In the post-World War II period, numerous blue collar, family wage jobs disappeared as the community's traditional employers, the mills and dye factories, were shut down. At first, these job losses were offset in part by gains at the nearby military bases, Fort Dix and McGuire Air Force Base, especially during the Vietnam War. In 1970, the residential vacancy rate in Mount Holly was 4.3%.

By 1980, however, the vacancy rate had climbed to 8.7% as a result of the nearby military installations' downsizing after the end of the Vietnam War. During this same period, 1970–1980, shopping malls proliferated in the suburban Philadelphia area, and retail business in Mount Holly suffered.

Historic district

The Mount Holly Historic District is a  historic district encompassing downtown Mount Holly. It was added to the National Register of Historic Places on February 20, 1973, for its significance in architecture, education, landscape architecture, politics/government, and transportation. The district includes 39 contributing buildings. The individually listed Old Schoolhouse, also known as the Brainerd School, was built in 1759 and contributes to the district. The Burlington County Prison is also listed individually and was listed as a National Historic Landmark in 1986. The Burlington County Courthouse was designed by architect Samuel Lewis and constructed by Michael Rush in 1796.

Geography
According to the U.S. Census Bureau, the township had a total area of 2.87 square miles (7.43 km2), including 2.82 square miles (7.31 km2) of land and 0.05 square miles (0.12 km2) of water (1.60%). The township borders the Burlington County municipalities of Eastampton Township, Hainesport Township, Lumberton, and Westampton. Clermont is an unincorporated community located within Mount Holly Township.

Climate

Demographics

2010 census

The Census Bureau's 2006–2010 American Community Survey showed that (in 2010 inflation-adjusted dollars) median household income was $53,841 (with a margin of error of ±$4,427) and the median family income was $68,500 (±$4,684). Males had a median income of $51,945 (±$5,141) versus $37,079 (±$5,759) for females. The per capita income for the borough was $24,551 (±$1,785). About 7.1% of families and 12.2% of the population were below the poverty line, including 21.4% of those under age 18 and 8.8% of those age 65 or over.

2000 census
As of the 2000 United States census, there were 10,728 people, 3,903 households, and 2,583 families residing in the township. The racial makeup of the township was 68.68% White, 21.57% African American, 0.42% Native American, 1.37% Asian, 0.07% Pacific Islander, 4.77% from other races, and 3.12% from two or more races. Hispanic or Latino of any race were 8.78% of the population.

There were 3,903 households, out of which 32.0% had children under the age of 18 living with them, 44.0% were married couples living together, 17.3% had a female householder with no husband present, and 33.8% were non-families. 27.2% of all households were made up of individuals, and 10.0% had someone living alone who was 65 years of age or older.  The average household size was 2.64 and the average family size was 3.20.

In the township, the age distribution of the population shows 26.3% under the age of 18, 9.4% from 18 to 24, 32.2% from 25 to 44, 19.6% from 45 to 64, and 12.4% who were 65 years of age or older.  The median age was 35 years. For every 100 females, there were 99.7 males.  For every 100 females age 18 and over, there were 96.6 males.

The median income for a household in the township was $43,284, and the median income for a family was $52,000. Males had a median income of $38,186 versus $27,425 for females. The per capita income for the township was $19,672.  About 6.8% of families and 9.9% of the population were below the poverty line, including 11.4% of those under age 18 and 10.4% of those age 65 or over.

Economy
Portions of the township are part of an Urban Enterprise Zone (UEZ), one of 32 zones covering 37 municipalities statewide. Mount Holly was selected in 1994 as one of a group of 10 zones added to participate in the program and one of four of those chosen based on a competition. In addition to other benefits to encourage employment and investment within the UEZ, shoppers can take advantage of a reduced 3.3125% sales tax rate (half of the % rate charged statewide) at eligible merchants. Established in March 1995, the city's Urban Enterprise Zone status expires in March 2026.  The Township Council appoints a board of directors that oversees the operations of the Urban Enterprise Zone, which is managed by Joshua Brown, the township's Economic Development Director.

Government

Local government
Mount Holly Township operates within the Faulkner Act (formally known as the Optional Municipal Charter Law) under the Council-Manager (plan 12) form of municipal government, enacted by council-initiated action as of July 1, 1990. This form is used in 42 (of the 564) municipalities statewide. The township council is comprised of five members who are elected at-large in a partisan vote to serve four-year terms of office on a staggered basis, with either two or three seats up for election in even-numbered years as part of the November general election. At a reorganization meeting after each election, the council selects a mayor and a deputy mayor from among its members. In November 2011, voters passed a referendum shifting from non-partisan municipal elections in May to partisan elections in November.

, members of the Mount Holly Township Council are Mayor Chris Banks (D, term on council ends December 31, 2024; term as mayor ends 2023), Deputy mayor Jason Jones (D, term on council ends 2024; term as deputy mayor ends 2023), Tara E. Astor (D, 2025), Lewis Brown (D, 2024) and Kim Burkus (D, 2025).

Federal, state, and county representation 
Mount Holly Township is located in the 3rd Congressional District and is part of New Jersey's 8th state legislative district. Prior to the 2011 reapportionment following the 2010 Census, Mount Holly Township had been in the 7th state legislative district.

 

Burlington County is governed by a Board of County Commissioners comprised of five members who are chosen at-large in partisan elections to serve three-year terms of office on a staggered basis, with either one or two seats coming up for election each year; at an annual reorganization meeting, the board selects a director and deputy director from among its members to serve a one-year term. , Burlington County's Commissioners are
Director Felicia Hopson (D, Willingboro Township, term as commissioner ends December 31, 2024; term as director ends 2023),
Deputy Director Tom Pullion (D, Edgewater Park, term as commissioner and as deputy director ends 2023),
Allison Eckel (D, Medford, 2025),
Daniel J. O'Connell (D, Delran Township, 2024) and 
Balvir Singh (D, Burlington Township, 2023). 
Burlington County's Constitutional Officers are
County Clerk Joanne Schwartz (R, Southampton Township, 2023)
Sheriff James H. Kostoplis (D, Bordentown, 2025) and 
Surrogate Brian J. Carlin (D, Burlington Township, 2026).

Politics
As of March 2011, there were a total of 5,251 registered voters in Mount Holly Township, of which 1,718 (32.7% vs. 33.3% countywide) were registered as Democrats, 1,034 (19.7% vs. 23.9%) were registered as Republicans and 2,496 (47.5% vs. 42.8%) were registered as Unaffiliated. There were 3 voters registered as Libertarians or Greens. Among the township's 2010 Census population, 55.1% (vs. 61.7% in Burlington County) were registered to vote, including 72.0% of those ages 18 and over (vs. 80.3% countywide).

In the 2012 presidential election, Democrat Barack Obama received 2,636 votes here (68.1% vs. 58.1% countywide), ahead of Republican Mitt Romney with 1,127 votes (29.1% vs. 40.2%) and other candidates with 53 votes (1.4% vs. 1.0%), among the 3,870 ballots cast by the township's 5,578 registered voters, for a turnout of 69.4% (vs. 74.5% in Burlington County). In the 2008 presidential election, Democrat Barack Obama received 2,771 votes here (67.2% vs. 58.4% countywide), ahead of Republican John McCain with 1,272 votes (30.8% vs. 39.9%) and other candidates with 58 votes (1.4% vs. 1.0%), among the 4,125 ballots cast by the township's 5,473 registered voters, for a turnout of 75.4% (vs. 80.0% in Burlington County). In the 2004 presidential election, Democrat John Kerry received 2,223 votes here (57.2% vs. 52.9% countywide), ahead of Republican George W. Bush with 1,612 votes (41.5% vs. 46.0%) and other candidates with 37 votes (1.0% vs. 0.8%), among the 3,887 ballots cast by the township's 5,301 registered voters, for a turnout of 73.3% (vs. 78.8% in the whole county).

In the 2013 gubernatorial election, Republican Chris Christie received 1,251 votes here (56.9% vs. 61.4% countywide), ahead of Democrat Barbara Buono with 891 votes (40.5% vs. 35.8%) and other candidates with 21 votes (1.0% vs. 1.2%), among the 2,200 ballots cast by the township's 5,429 registered voters, yielding a 40.5% turnout (vs. 44.5% in the county). In the 2009 gubernatorial election, Democrat Jon Corzine received 1,126 ballots cast (49.6% vs. 44.5% countywide), ahead of Republican Chris Christie with 977 votes (43.1% vs. 47.7%), Independent Chris Daggett with 118 votes (5.2% vs. 4.8%) and other candidates with 38 votes (1.7% vs. 1.2%), among the 2,269 ballots cast by the township's 5,524 registered voters, yielding a 41.1% turnout (vs. 44.9% in the county).

Education 
For pre-kindergarten through eighth grade, students attend the Mount Holly Township Public Schools. As of the 2021–22 school year, the district, comprised of three schools, had an enrollment of 1,079 students and 102.0 classroom teachers (on an FTE basis), for a student–teacher ratio of 10.6:1. Schools in the district (with 2021–22 enrollment data from the National Center for Education Statistics) are 
John Brainerd School with 293 students in grades PreK-1, Gertrude C. Folwell School with 302 students in grades 2-4, and F. W. Holbein Middle School with 439 students in grades 6-8.

For ninth through twelfth grades, public school students attend the Rancocas Valley Regional High School, a comprehensive regional public high school based in Mount Holly that serves students from five communities encompassing an area of  that also includes the communities of Eastampton Township, Hainesport Township, Lumberton and Westampton. As of the 2021–22 school year, the high school had an enrollment of 2,048 students and 140.3 classroom teachers (on an FTE basis), for a student–teacher ratio of 14.6:1. The school is located in Mount Holly. The district's board of education is comprised of nine members who are elected directly by voters to serve three-year terms of office on a staggered basis, with three seats up for election each year as part of the November general election. Seats on the board are allocated based on the population of the five constituent municipalities, with two seats assigned to Mount Holly.

Students from Mount Holly, and from all of Burlington County, are eligible to attend the Burlington County Institute of Technology, a countywide public school district that serves the vocational and technical education needs of students at the high school and post-secondary level at its campuses in Medford and Westampton.

Sacred Heart School is a Catholic school serving students in grades PreK-8, operating under the auspices of the Roman Catholic Diocese of Trenton.

Transportation

Roads and highways

The only state highway serving Mount Holly is Route 38, which crosses from west to east at the township's southern end. Major county roads that pass through Mount Holly include County Route 537 and County Route 541.

Mount Holly is accessible at exit 5 of the New Jersey Turnpike in neighboring Westampton and exit 47 of Interstate 295 via CR 541 in Burlington Township.

Public transportation
NJ Transit provides bus service to Philadelphia on routes 317 (from Asbury Park) and 409/417/418 (from Trenton), with local service available on the 413 route between Camden and Burlington.

Points of interest

 Burlington County Courthouse, 1796
 Mount Holly Cemetery
 Shinn Curtis Log House, constructed out of hand-hewn logs, the house was built in 1712; the original log house was uncovered in 1967. A larger house that had been built around it was demolished, revealing the early house beneath, which has been restored.
 Burlington County Prison, opened in 1819, it was the oldest continually operated prison in the country when it closed in 1965 after more than 150 years of service.
First Presbyterian Church
 St. Andrew's Episcopal Church
 Friends Meeting House
 Brainerd Schoolhouse is a one-room schoolhouse that was constructed in 1759 and operated as a school for nearly 100 years. In 1951, the school was transferred from the Female Benevolent Society, which had owned and operated the site for 136 years, to the National Society of the Colonial Dames of America.
 Relief Fire Company No. 1, home of the oldest continuously operating volunteer fire company in the United States.
 Thomas Budd House is the township's third-oldest house, dating to 1744.
 Stephen Girard House was the home of Girard, who moved to Mount Holly shortly after his marriage in 1777 and purchased the partially completed house, as recorded in 1779.
 John Woolman Memorial was constructed in the late 1700s on a portion of an orchard that had belonged to Woolman.

In popular culture
The pop punk band The High Court from the township released the 2007 album Puppet Strings.

Notable people

People who were born in, residents of, or otherwise closely associated with Mount Holly include:

 James William Abert (1820–1897), soldier, explorer, ornithologist and topographical artist
 Gamaliel Bailey (1807–1859), journalist and early abolitionist
 Cindy Birdsong (born 1939), singer who became famous as a member of The Supremes in 1967, when she replaced co-founding member Florence Ballard
 Anthony S. Black (born 1951), jockey and Kentucky Derby winner
 Charles C. Black (1858–1947), Associate Justice of the New Jersey Supreme Court who was the Democratic nominee for Governor of New Jersey in 1904
 Zach Braddock (born 1987), pitcher who has played for the Milwaukee Brewers
 Shaun Bradley (born 1997), American football linebacker for the Philadelphia Eagles
 Samuel A. Dobbins (1814–1905), represented New Jersey's 2nd congressional district in the United States House of Representatives from 1873 to 1877
 Paul Doguereau (1908–2000), pianist
 Barrows Dunham (1905–1995), professor of philosophy who was fired in 1953 by Temple University after refusing to answer questions posed by the House Un-American Activities Committee
 Doug Easlick (born 1980), fullback who played in the NFL for the Miami Dolphins in the 2004 season
 Matthew Emmons (born 1981), sport shooter who won a gold medal in the 50-meter rifle prone event at the 2004 Summer Olympics in Athens
 Pat Fidelia (born 1959), former professional soccer player
 Samuel C. Forker (1821–1900), represented New Jersey's 2nd congressional district in the United States House of Representatives from 1871 to 1873
 Mike Freeman (born 1961), former guard who played in the NFL for seasons with the Denver Broncos and Los Angeles Raiders
 Irving Fryar (born 1962), former Philadelphia Eagles football player
 Dan Gakeler (born 1964), former MLB pitcher who played for the Detroit Tigers during the 1991 season
 Joseph H. Gaskill (1851–1935), judge on the New Jersey Court of Common Pleas and Justice of the New Jersey Supreme Court from 1893 to 1896
 Ron Gassert (born 1940), former football player for the University of Virginia and the Green Bay Packers
 John F. Gerry (1926–1995), former chief United States district judge on the United States District Court for the District of New Jersey
 Ed Gillespie (born 1961), Republican political strategist who was a senior advisor to Mitt Romney's 2012 presidential campaign and former Counselor to the President for George W. Bush
 Stephen Girard (1750–1831), merchant, banker, philanthropist, and humanitarian
 Louis Greenwald (born 1967), member of the New Jersey General Assembly since 1996
 Franco Harris (born 1950), former Pittsburgh Steelers football player. Ranked #3 on the Sports Illustrated list of The 50 Greatest New Jersey Sports Figures
 Pete Harris (1957–2006), All-American safety at Penn State University
 Dwight Hicks (born 1956), defensive back who played in the NFL for the San Francisco 49ers and Indianapolis Colts
 Edward Young Higbee (1810–1871), Episcopal clergyman who served as Chaplain of the United States Senate
 Ernest Hilbert (born 1970), poet, opera librettist and rare book dealer
 Peter Hill (1767–1820), former slave who was the first African American clockmaker
 David Johnson (born 1964), rifle shooter who won a gold medal in the 10m air rifle event at the 1991 Pan American Games and competed at the 1992 Summer Olympics
 Ruth G. King (born 1933), educational psychologist who was the first woman to serve as president of the Association of Black Psychologists
 Leslie E. Kobayashi (born 1957), Judge of the United States District Court for the District of Hawaii
 Kevin Landolt (born 1975), defensive tackle who played one season in the NFL for the Jacksonville Jaguars in 1999
 Isabeau Levito (born 2007), figure skater who was the 2022 U.S. national bronze medalist
 Geraldine Clinton Little (1923–1997), poet
 Mary Lum (1758–1815), moved here with her husband Stephen Girard in 1777 before being committed for the rest of her life to the insanity ward at Pennsylvania Hospital in 1785
 Ricky Lumpkin (born 1988), NFL defensive tackle for the Oakland Raiders
 Britt McHenry (born 1986), sports reporter
 John A. Nagy, author of nonfiction history books on espionage and mutinies during the American Revolution
 Barbara Park (1947–2013), author of children's literature best known for her series of books starring the character Junie B. Jones
 Barry T. Parker (born 1932), member of the New Jersey General Assembly and State Senate
 Frank Parsons (1854–1908), professor, social reformer and public intellectual
 Charles Sreeve Peterson (1818–1889), founder of Morgan Valley, Utah, and co-founder of Mormon colonies in Mexico
 Jeremy Riddle (born 1977), Christian music singer.
 Samuel K. Robbins (1853–1926), politician who served as Speaker of the New Jersey General Assembly and President of the New Jersey Senate
 William Rossell (1760–1840), judge on the United States District Court for the District of New Jersey
 Jim Saxton (born 1943), former representative from 
 Thomas C. Sharp (1818–1894), newspaper publisher and outspoken opponent of Joseph Smith who was charged (and acquitted) in the death of Smith
 Charles V. Shank (born 1943), physicist who served as the director of the Lawrence Berkeley National Laboratory from 1989 to 2004
 Robert C. Shinn Jr. (born 1937), politician who served in the New Jersey General Assembly from the 8th Legislative District from 1985 to 1994
 Michael Sis (born 1960), sixth bishop of the Roman Catholic Diocese of San Angelo in Texas
 Harrison Slater, pianist and mystery writer
 Michelle Smith (born 1972/1973), fashion designer
 José F. Sosa (born 1950), politician who was mayor of Mont Holly and served in the New Jersey General Assembly from 1992 to 1994
 Alonzo Spellman (born 1971), defensive lineman who played in the NFL for the Chicago Bears, Dallas Cowboys and Detroit Lions
 Earl W. Stafford (born 1948), entrepreneur and philanthropist
 John L. N. Stratton (1817–1889), member of the United States House of Representatives from New Jersey
 John C. Ten Eyck (1814–1879), politician who represented New Jersey in the United States Senate from 1859 to 1865
 M. Louise Thomas (1822–1907), social reformer
 DeMya Walker (born 1977), professional basketball player
 Barclay White (1821–1906), Superintendent of Indian Affairs during the administration of president Ulysses S. Grant
 John Woolman (1720–1772), noted Quaker essayist and preacher, early anti-slavery advocate

References

Reading list
 Bastien, Jan Lynn, Ghosts of Mount Holly; A History of Haunted Happenings. (Charleston, SC: The History Press, 2008)
 De Cou, George.  Historical Sketches of Mount Holly and Vicinity. (Mount Holly, NJ: G. DeCou, 1936).
 Rizzo, Dennis C. Mount Holly, New Jersey: Hometown Reinvented. (Charleston, SC: The History Press, 2007).
 Shinn, Henry C. The History of Mount Holly. (Mount Holly, NJ:  Herald Printing House, 1977).
 Winzinger, Heidi J. and Mary L. Smith. Mount Holly (Images of America). (Charleston, SC: Arcadia Publishing, 2001).

External links

Mount Holly Revolutionary War sites, with photographs
 
 
 

 
1688 establishments in New Jersey
County seats in New Jersey
Faulkner Act (council–manager)
New Jersey Urban Enterprise Zones
Populated places established in 1688
Townships in Burlington County, New Jersey